Henry Greer may refer to:

Henry Greer (politician) (1855–1933), Irish soldier, politician, and racing horse owner and breeder
Henry Greer (field hockey) (1899–1978), American field hockey player

See also
Harry Greer (1876–1947), British businessman and politician